Quebracho  may refer to:
 Quebracho (film), an Argentine 1974 film directed by Ricardo Wullicher
 Quebracho (group), a left-wing Argentine group
 Quebracho (money), an unofficial monetary unit in the Argentine Chaco Province during the economical crisis in 2001-2002
 Quebracho tree, different trees

Places
Uruguay
 Quebracho, Cerro Largo, a place in Cerro Largo Department
 Quebracho, Paysandú, a place in Paysandú Department

Elsewhere
 Quebrachos Department, a department in Santiago del Estero Province, Argentina
 El Quebracho, a caserio (hamlet) in Dulce Nombre de María municipality in El Salvador